Cuba is a town and municipality in the District of Beja in Portugal. The population in 2011 was 4,878, in an area of 172.09 km2.

The current mayor (since 2013) is João Português. The municipal holiday is Monday after Easter.

History

The name "Cuba" is likely of Arabic origin, pertaining to the qubba, that is cupola or domed tombs of ascetic spiritual leaders. Such toponyms are frequent in Southern Portugal and likely related to the Sufi movements that flourished during the period of Almoravid decay, such as the one led by Ibn Qasi.

In the 20th century a small number of scholars sought to make Columbus a Portuguese man. One of these attempts had him born in the town of Cuba, after which he would have named the Caribbean island (see possible birthplace of Christopher Columbus). A statue honouring the explorer can be seen in the city centre.

Parishes
Administratively, the municipality is divided into 4 civil parishes (freguesias):
 Cuba
 Faro do Alentejo
 Vila Alva
 Vila Ruiva

Notable people 
 Diogo Dias Melgás (1638 in Cuba, Alentejo - 1700) a Portuguese composer of late-Renaissance sacred polyphony.

References

External links
Town Hall official website

Towns in Portugal
Populated places in Beja District
Municipalities of Beja District